San Nicolao is an architecture, Roman Catholic parish church located in the town of Borgiallo in the metropolitan city of Turin, region of Piedmont, Italy.

History
A church at site, of medieval construction was replaced by the present church in 1863. The Romanesque architecture campanile, likely from the 11th century still remains. The stone tower has traces of mullioned windown, now closed and a closed arcade. The sober facade of the church has two heavy columns; the interior layout is of a Greek Cross tre navate, con five altars. In the choir is an altarpiece depicting Santi Nicolao e Giorgio (1834) by Giorgio Cigliana (painter).

References

Churches in the province of Turin
19th-century Roman Catholic church buildings in Italy
Roman Catholic churches completed in 1863